Behncke is a surname. Notable people with the surname include:

 Isabel Behncke, Chilean primatologist
 Matt Behncke (born 1980), American soccer player
 Paul Behncke (1869–1937), Imperial German Navy admiral

See also 
 Benke
 Behnke
 Benkei

Low German surnames